Cherneka Lee Johnson (born 3 March 1995) is a professional boxer who has held the IBF female junior-featherweight title since April 2022. Born in New Zealand, she represents Australia in international competition. 

In her career, Johnson has won three major boxing titles which also include winning the WBA Oceania female bantamweight title in 2017 against Filipino boxer Gretel de Paz, and the WIBA bantamweight title in 2018 against Thailand boxer Rungnapha Kaewkrachang. In 2021, Johnson fought Shannon O'Connell for the WBA Gold female bantamweight title. The fight was close, however, Shannon O'Connell won the fight by split decision.

Amateur career 
Johnson began her boxing career in the amateur division in 2011 after she moved to Australia. When fighting in international competitions she would represent Australia. In the four AIBA World Boxing Amateur Championships she has won the 2011 Junior World Championships, came 5th in the 2013 Youth World Championships and reached top 16 in the Elite World Championships in 2012 and 2014. She has won multiple National titles including three Australian national championships and three Golden Gloves championships. Johnson ended her amateur boxing career, competing in over 60 amateur boxing fights.

Professional career

Debut to Regional Champion 2016 - 2018 
Johnson made her professional boxing debut in 2016 against Thailand Napaporn Ruengsuwan who was also making their professional debut. Johnson won the fight by second round stoppage. After two more wins, Johnson ended her 2016 year with the fourth fight in her career, taking on Thailand boxer Ratsadaporn Khiaosopa. This was the second time in her career where Johnson won the fight by stoppage, but this time in the first round. After a successful 2017, Johnson last fight of the year was against Filipino Boxer Gretel de Paz for the WBA Oceania Bantamweight title. Johnson won the fight by Unanimous Decision. A few months later, Johnson fought for the WIBA World Bantamweight  title against Thailand boxer Rungnapha Kaewkrachang. Johnson won the fight by stoppage. After the fight, Johnson peaked in the world boxing rankings second in the IBF and sixth in the WBA. In August 2018, Johnson competed in her tenth professional boxing fight against Thailand boxer Siriphon Chanbuala. Johnson won the fight by second round Knockout.

Becoming World Champion 2019 - Present 
In 2019, Johnson had a very successful year by defeating boxers with great records including Kirti, Arasa Nimnoi, Nurshahidah Roslie. Due to COVID-19 Pandemic, Johnson was not able to fight during 2020. In March 2021, Johnson fought Shannon O'Connell for the WBA Gold World Bantamweight title. The fight was a close fight, however, O'Connell won the fight by Split Decision. In April 2022, Johnson took on Mexican boxer Melissa Esquivel for the IBF World Super Bantamweight title. Johnson won the fight by Split Decision becoming the second Maori, third New Zealand female, fourth New Zealand born and seventh New Zealand citizen to win a major World boxing title. In October 2022, Johnson defended her World title against Susie Ramadan on the Devin Haney vs. George Kambosos Jr II undercard. Johnson won the fight by Unanimous Decision, becoming the first Maori World champion boxer to successfully defend her world title. After the fight, Johnsons opponent Ramadan took to the mic and made allegation that Johnson was using Performing enhancing drugs. In November 2022, Johnson was signed with major boxing promoter Lou DiBella under DiBella Entertainment.

Personal life 
Johnson moved to Australia at the age of 12. She is of Maori descent of the iwi Ngāti Ranginui. She is the eldest of three, having one brother and one sister.

Amateur boxing titles 
2011 AIBA Women's Junior World Boxing Championships Games
2012 China Youth world championships 
2014 China elite world championships
Five time Queensland State Champion
Three time Australian National Champion
Three time Golden Gloves Champion

Professional boxing titles 
 World Boxing Association
 Oceania Bantamweight title
 Womens international Boxing Association
 World Bantamweight title
 International Boxing Federation
 World Super Bantamweight title

Professional boxing record

Media appearances
In 2022, Johnson competed on the reality competition series The Challenge: Australia.

References

External links

1995 births
Living people
Sportspeople from Melbourne
Sportspeople from Tauranga
Australian women boxers
New Zealand women boxers
Featherweight boxers
Boxers from Melbourne
New Zealand world boxing champions
The Challenge (TV series) contestants